Warham may refer to:
Places
 Warham, Herefordshire, England
 Warham, Norfolk, England

People
 Joe Warham - English rugby league footballer, coach and administrator
 John Warham - New Zealand ornithologist
 William Warham (1450-1532) - Archbishop of Canterbury
William Warham (Archdeacon of Canterbury)  (c. 1480 – 1557), nephew of the Archbishop of Canterbury

Companies
Thornewill and Warham - an English engineering company (1849-1929)

See also
 Wareham (disambiguation)